The 1979 South American Championships in Athletics were held in Bucaramanga, Colombia, between 31 October and 4 November.

Medal summary

Men's events

Women's events

† = short course (c37km)

* = light implement (1.75 kg)

† = short course

Medal table

External links
 Men Results – GBR Athletics
 Women Results – GBR Athletics
 Medallists

South American
South American Championships in Athletics
International athletics competitions hosted by Colombia
South American
1979 in South American sport